The 2006 American Indoor Football League was the league's 2nd overall season.  The league champions were the Canton Legends, who defeated the Rome Renegades in American Bowl II.

Standings

 Green indicates clinched playoff berth
 Purple indicates division champion
 Grey indicates best league record
 During regular season, all teams played within their conference.
 * = Filled in for games, due to Syracuse folding during the season. All three of these teams were outdoor amateur teams in the North American Football League.
 ** = Played remainder of Ghostriders road games, due to team folding during season.

Playoffs

*=Forfeit win

External links
 2006 AIFL Standings
 2006 AIFL Schedule
 2006 AIFL Playoffs

American Indoor Football Association seasons
2006 in American football